I for You, You for Me (German: Ich für dich, du für mich) is a 1934 German drama film directed by Carl Froelich and starring Ruth Eweler, Karl Dannemann and Carl de Vogt. It was made as a propaganda film in support of the Nazi regime's Reich Labour Service and the League of German Girls. It promoted the concepts of blood and soil.

Cast 
Maria Wancka as Lagerführerin
 Inge Kick as Hanne
 Ruth Eweler as 	Inge
 Ruth Claus as 	Maria
 Karl Dannemann as 	Christian Busch
 Carl de Vogt as 	Siedler Kollerbuch
 Knut Hartwig as Siedler Schmidelka
 Eleonore Stadie as 	Berta
 Liselotte Wahl as 	Lotte
 Heinz Rippert as 	Werner Kramer
 Paul W. Krüger as Siedler Mahlow
 Katja Bennefeld as 	Frau Kollerbuch
 Hugo Froelich as 	Gendarm Kisecke
 Ernst Gronau as 	Herr Häberlein
 Emilia Unda as 	Frau Häberlein
 Toni Tetzlaff as Frau Höpfner

References

Bibliography
 Hales, Barbara, Petrescu, Mihaela and Weinstein, Valerie. Continuity and Crisis in German Cinema, 1928-1936. Boydell & Brewer, 2016
 Klaus, Ulrich J. Deutsche Tonfilme: Jahrgang 1934. Klaus-Archiv, 1988.
 Waldman, Harry. Nazi Films in America, 1933-1942. McFarland, 2008.
 Welch, David. The Third Reich: Politics and Propaganda. Psychology Press, 2002.

External links 

1934 films
Films of Nazi Germany
1930s German-language films
German black-and-white films
German drama films
1934 drama films
1930s German films